The Cabinet of Bjarni Benediktsson was formed on 11 January 2017, following the 2016 parliamentary election. The cabinet was led by Bjarni Benediktsson of the Independence Party, who served as Prime Minister of Iceland.

The cabinet was a coalition government consisting the Independence Party, the Reform Party and Bright Future. Together they held 32 of the 63 seats in the Parliament of Iceland and served as a majority government. In the cabinet, there were eleven ministers where six were from the Independence Party, three were from the Reform Party and two were from Bright Future.

Cabinet

See also
Government of Iceland
Cabinet of Iceland

References

2017 establishments in Iceland
Icelandic cabinets
Cabinets established in 2017
Independence Party (Iceland)